Kavaklı (literally "with poplar") is a Turkish place name and may refer to:

Kavaklı, Ergani
Kavaklı, Gelibolu
Kavaklı, Ilgaz
Kavaklı, İspir
Kavaklı, Kırklareli, a  town in the central district of Kırklareli Province
Kavaklı, Kahta, a village in Kahta district of Adıyaman Proıvince
Kavaklı, Şuhut, a village in Şuhut district of Afyonkarahisar Province
Kavaklı, Göynücek, a village in Göynücek district of Amasya Province
Kavaklı, Mut, a village in Mut district of Mersin Province

See also 
 Kavaklıdere (disambiguation)